John Poulson Keyser, known professionally as John K (formerly stylized as JOHN.k), is an American pop singer.

Career 
K's first single was the song "OT", which he self-released in 2017. His single "If We Never Met" came to the attention of Elvis Duran, who got K booked to perform the song on Today.

He signed with Epic Records in April 2019. His follow-up single to "If We Never Met" was titled "Wasted Summer".

In April 2020, his single "If We Never Met" was certified gold by RIAA. In September of the same year, his single "If We Never Met" was certified platinum by RIAA.

Discography

Studio albums

Extended plays

Singles

As lead artist

As featured artist

References 

1990 births
Living people
Musicians from Orlando, Florida
American male singers
Songwriters from Florida
American male songwriters